The Salim Khan family refers to the family of Salim Khan which is a prominent Indian show business family, and is one of the prominent Bollywood film clans. Multiple members of the family have been actors, screenwriters, film directors and producers in the Hindi film industry of India. Salim, one half of the duo Salim–Javed, is one of the most famous screenwriters in the history of Indian cinema. His son, actor Salman Khan, has been the prominent face of the family since the 1990s, as one of the biggest Bollywood movie stars in history of Indian cinema.

Salim was born in 1935 in Indore in the Central Provinces and Berar in British India. His father was an immigrant from Afghanistan who migrated and settled in Indore (now in Madhya Pradesh). The family also has roots in Jammu and Kashmir, from the father of Salma Khan (born Sushila Charak), Salim's first wife. Some members of the family also have roots in Kerala (ex-wife of Arbaaz Khan Malaika Arora through her maternal side), Punjab (Atul Agnihotri, Seema Sachdev and Malaika Arora through her paternal side) and Burma (Helen).

Generations

First generation
 Anwar Khan, Father of Abdul Rashid Khan, Grandfather of Salim Khan. He was a Alakozai Pashtun who migrated from Afghanistan to India in the mid-1800s and served in the cavalry of the British Indian Army

Second generation
 Abdul Rashid Khan (died 1950), Father of Salim Khan. He was a DIG in Indian Imperial Police in Indore

Third generation
 Salim Khan (born 1935), Indian actor and screenwriter
 Salma Khan (born Sushila Charak), first wife of Salim Khan, father from Jammu and Kashmir and mother from Maharashtra
 Helen Richardson Khan (born Helen Richardson, 1938), second wife of Salim Khan, actress and dancer

Fourth generation
 Salman Khan (born Abdul Rashid Salim Salman Khan, 1965), Indian actor, producer, television presenter, philanthropist and humanitarian.
 Arbaaz Khan (born 1967), Indian actor, director and film producer known for his work in Hindi cinema
 Sohail Khan (born 1970), Indian film actor, director and producer who works predominantly in Hindi cinema
 Alvira Khan Agnihotri (born 1969), film producer and fashion designer, daughter of Salim and Salma
 Atul Agnihotri (born 1970), husband of Alvira, Indian film producer, director and former actor
 Arpita Khan, daughter of Salim Khan
 Aayush Sharma, husband of Arpita

Fifth generation
 Alizeh Agnihotri, daughter of Alvira and Atul
 Ayaan Agnihotri, son of Alvira and Atul
 Arhaan Khan, son of Arbaaz and Malaika Arora
 Nirvan Khan, son of Sohail and Seema
 Yohan Khan, son of Sohail and Seema
 Ahil Sharma, son of Arpita and Aayush
 Ayat Sharma, daughter of Arpita and Aayush

Contributions

Salim Khan

Salim Khan was a screenwriter, who wrote the screenplays, stories and scripts for numerous Bollywood films. In Hindi cinema, Khan is best known for being one half of the prolific screenwriting duo Salim–Javed, along with Javed Akhtar. The duo Salim-Javed were the first Indian screenwriters to achieve star status, becoming the most successful Indian screenwriters of all time.

Salim-Javed revolutionized Indian cinema in the 1970s, transforming and reinventing the Bollywood formula, pioneering the Bollywood blockbuster format, and pioneering genres such as the masala film and the Dacoit Western. Salim Khan was also responsible for creating the "angry young man" character archetype and launching Amitabh Bachchan's career. Salim-Javed won six Filmfare Awards, and their films are among the highest-grossing Indian films of all time, including Sholay (1975), the highest-grossing Indian film ever at the time, as well as films such as Seeta Aur Geeta (1972), Zanjeer (1973), Deewaar (1975), Kranti (1981), and the Don franchise.

Salman Khan

Ever since the blockbuster Maine Pyar Kiya (1989), has been known for being one of the three biggest movie stars of Bollywood since the 1990s, along with Aamir Khan and Shah Rukh Khan, collectively known as the three Khans of Bollywood. He is often known for starring in blockbuster masala films, a genre that was originally pioneered by his father Salim Khan.

Arbaaz Khan 

Arbaaz Khan, ever since the blockbuster Daraar (1996). He is often known for starring in blockbuster masala films, a genre that was originally pioneered by his father Salim Khan.

Sohail Khan

Sohail Khan, the youngest of the Khan brothers, produces films under his banner Sohail Khan Productions. He has appeared on the TV show Comedy Circus as one of the judges. He is known for his films Jai Ho (2014), Pyaar Kiya To Darna Kya (1998) and Hello Brother.

Alvira Khan 

Alivra Khan Agnihotri, the sister of the khan brothers, film producer and fashion designer. She is a producer of blockbuster films like Hello (2008), Bodyguard (2011), Bharat (2019) .

See also
List of Hindi film clans

References

 
Afghan families
Indian Muslims
Kashmiri families
Muslim families
Pashtun families
Indian Christians
Indian Roman Catholics
Christian families
Marathi families